Ignatius Michael Duffy (January 27, 1875 – October 6, 1958) was an American football coach. He served as the head coach at Alma College in 1895 and as an assistant coach at the University of Michigan in 1897. He played college football for one season at Michigan.

Biography
A native of Ann Arbor, Michigan, Duffy attended Ann Arbor High School. He attended college at the University of Michigan. In 1895, while a student at Michigan, Duffy served as the head football coach for Alma College in Alma, Michigan. His coaching record at Alma was 3–1. He played on the football team as a fullback in 1896. In 1897, he served as an assistant coach for the Michigan football team. Duffy was a member of the Alpha Epsilon fraternity. He spent only "a short time in college". In 1902, Duffy was working as an electrician.  His brothers James E. Duffy and John Duffy also played football for Michigan.

Head coaching record

References

External links
 

1875 births
1958 deaths
19th-century players of American football
American football fullbacks
Alma Scots football coaches
Michigan Wolverines football players
Michigan Wolverines football coaches
Players of American football from Ann Arbor, Michigan